KLVD-LD, virtual and UHF digital channel 23, is a low-powered Daystar owned-and-operated television station licensed to Las Vegas, Nevada, United States. The station is owned by the Word of God Fellowship. It is not available on Cox Cable at this time.

KLVD was launched around April 2, 2006.

Digital channels
The station's digital signal is multiplexed:

In December 2015, KLVD added a 23.2 sub-channel simulcasting the main 23.1 Daystar programming in 480i 4x3, while the 23.1 programs in 720p 16x9.

References

External links
 Query the FCC's TV station database for KLVD-LD

LVD-LD
Daystar (TV network) affiliates
Television channels and stations established in 2006
Low-power television stations in the United States